The Panthean Temple, abbreviated as PTC as the Panthean Temple of Connecticut, is located in New Haven County, Connecticut and was the first Pagan and Wiccan church to incorporate in the state of Connecticut under its first name of the "Pagan Community Church," and is a non-profit 501(c)3 religious organization.  It was founded by Rev. Alicia Lyon Folberth, in 1995.

Practices
The Panthean Temple is open to Witches and Pagans of all traditions who honor harm none, which they consider to be a universal tenet of all true spiritual paths. Their practices are devotional, and are primarily Odyssean tradition, although individual public rituals may vary depending on the people leading them and the traditions they practice, but do not consider themselves eclectic.

Panthean Temple Membership consists of several levels corresponding with participation: Affiliate, Full Membership, Outer Court, and Inner Court.

Odyssean Wicca has its roots within British Traditional Wicca but like the Wiccan Church of Canada, the temple's purpose is to provide public ministry services, such as open worship, rites of passage, and prison and hospital visitations. The Panthean Temple is notable for its large festival, "Beltaine: A Pagan Odyssey," which began in 1999.

See also
Odyssean Wicca
List of Pagan traditions

Notes and references

External links
Panthean Temple new website under construction
Keepers of the Flame TV: Panthean Temple public access television show blog
Beltaine: A Pagan Odyssey Festival website
Wiccan Church of Canada (WCC) website

Wiccan organisations
Wicca in the United States
Modern pagan organizations based in the United States
Modern pagan organizations established in 1995